Baldev Upadhyaya (10 October 1899 – 10 August 1999) was a Hindi, Sanskrit scholar, literary historian, essayist and critic. He wrote numerous books, collections of essays and a historical outline of Sanskrit literature. He is noted for discussing Sanskrit literature in the Hindi language.  Earlier books related to Sanskrit literature were often written either in Sanskrit or in English.

Life
He was born on 10 October 1899 in the village Sonbarsa in the Ballia district of Uttar Pradesh, British India. His father was Pt. Ram Suchit Upadhyaya, who was a great scholar of the Bhagavata Puraṇa, and his mother was Murti Devi.  He had two brothers.

Upadhyaya's early education was in Govt. High School, Ballia, except for a session 1911–1912, when he was admitted to the 6th standard at Bengali Tola Inter College, Benares. He passed his M.A. from Banaras Hindu University (1922) and Sahityacharya from Govt. Sanskrit College, Benares.

He married Shivmuni Devi, daughter of Pt. Dev Krishna Ojha, granddaughter of Pt. Yogesh Dutt Ojha, a Sanskrit scholar and author of Paribhashendu Shekhar, which was published from Sampurnanand Sanskrit Vishwavidyalaya, Varanasi.

He died on 10 August in his centenary year 1999 at Varanasi. He had two sons. One of his son named Dr. G. S. Upadhyaya is retired from IIT Kanpur, where he was a professor in Department of Materials and Metallurgical Engineering. Dr. G. S. Upadhyaya also have been the head of department. The grandson of Baldev Upadhyaya named Dr. Anish Upadhyaya is currently professor in Department of Materials and Metallurgical Engineering, IIT Kanpur, Kanpur, UP.

Students
His students include Hazari Prasad Dwivedi, Vidya Niwas Mishra, Vibhuti Narayan Singh, Sitaram Chaturvedi, Kalu Lal Shrimali, Rewa Prasad Dwivedi, J. N. Chaturvedi, Triloki Nath Chaturvedi, and Vishnu Kant Shastri.

Major works
In 1922 he was appointed as a lecturer in the Department of Sanskrit at Banaras Hindu University. After serving the institution for 38 years he retired as Head of the Department in 1960. In 1968 he was again appointed as director and professor emeritus of the Research Institute at Sampurnanand Sanskrit University. He also served as president, Uttar Pradesh Sanskrit Academy, Lucknow.

When he was director of the Research Institute, he was the chief editor of the book series, Sarasvati Bhavana Granthamala, and the Sanskrit journal Sarasvati Sushama. He wrote many books which are the outcome of original studies and are authoritative in the respected fields. He also edited about 25 books.

Awards and honours
 Mangla Prasad Puraskar, 1942
 Dalmia Puraskar, 1946
 Shravan-Nath Puraskara
 Sahitya Varidhi, Prayag, 1972
 D.Litt., 1977
 Certificate of Honour, Awarded by Zakir Hussain, President of India  1968.
 Kalidas Sahitya Ratna, Ujjain, 1982
 Vishva Sanskrit Bharati Award, U.P. Sanskrit Academy, 1983.
 Padma Bhushan Awarded by Giani Zail Singh, President of India, 1984.
 Umaswami Award, Kunda Kunda Bharati Ch. Trust, New Delhi, 1994
 Mahamahopadhyaya, 1997
 Rama Krishna Dalmiya Sri Vani Award, Ramkrishna Dalmiya Trust, New Delhi

Books
Upadhyaya had chosen Hindi as his medium for writing books. There were no authoritative books on all branch of Sanskrit literature.

References

People from Ballia district
Banaras Hindu University alumni
Recipients of the Padma Bhushan in literature & education
Indian male writers
1899 births
1999 deaths
Scholars from Varanasi
20th-century Indian historians